The Nanaimo Museum (originally the Nanaimo Centennial Museum) is a museum located in Nanaimo, British Columbia, Canada; it opened in November 1967.

See also
List of coal mines and landmarks in the Nanaimo area

References

External links 
 Nanaimo Museum

Museums in British Columbia
History museums in British Columbia
Buildings and structures in Nanaimo